Klover was an American, short-lived Boston punk band, consisting of Mike Stone (later a Queensrÿche guitarist) on vocals and guitar, Chris Doherty (ex-Gang Green) on lead guitar, Darren Hill (ex-Red Rockers, Paul Westerberg) on bass and Brian Betzger (ex-Jerry's Kids, Gang Green) on drums.

They released only one album, Feel Lucky Punk?, and an EP, Beginning to End, on Mercury Records in 1995 and disbanded after the subsequent tour. "Beginning to End" was used in the soundtrack for the 1995 Sylvester Stallone film Assassins.

Discography 
Feel Lucky Punk? (Mercury, 1995)
 "Our Way"
 "Beginning to End" 
 "Here I Go Again"
 "All Kindsa Girls" 
 "What a Waste" 
 "I Wanna Be" 
 "Memory" 
 "Brain" 
 "Illusions (Make It Go Away)" 
 "Sandbag" 
 "Building a Wall"
 "Y.R.U. (Still Here)" 

Beginning to End (EP) (Mercury, 1995)
 "Beginning to End" 
 "Common Factor" (non-lp)
 "Nothing" (non-lp)
 "Building a Wall"

References

External links
Klover
Robert Christgau: CG: Klover

Punk rock groups from Massachusetts
Musical groups from Boston
Musical groups established in 1995
Musical groups disestablished in 1995
1995 establishments in Massachusetts
1995 disestablishments in Massachusetts